Oru Velladu Vengaiyagiradhu is a 1980 Indian Tamil-language film directed by Devaraj–Mohan. The film stars Sivakumar and Saritha. It was released on 12 January 1980.

Plot

Cast 
 Sivakumar
 Saritha
 Vijayakumar

Production 
Oru Velladu Vengaiyagiradhu was directed by the duo Devaraj–Mohan and produced by V. Senthamarai under Sathya Movies. The screenplay was written by R. M. Veerappan, and the dialogues were written by Vijay Krishnaraj.

Soundtrack 
The soundtrack was composed by M. S. Viswanathan, while the lyrics were written by Vaali, Pulamaipithan, Na Kamarasan and Muthulingam.

Release 
Oru Velladu Vengaiyagiradhu was released on 12 January 1980. Kalki negatively reviewed the film, saying the goat in the title was not becoming a leopard, but a bug.

References

External links 
 

1980s Tamil-language films
Films directed by Devaraj–Mohan
Films scored by M. S. Viswanathan